Henry Seiler Wise (July 16, 1909 – March 16, 1982) was a United States district judge of the United States District Court for the Eastern District of Illinois and the United States District Court for the Central District of Illinois.

Education and career

Born in Mt. Carmel, Illinois, Wise received an Artium Baccalaureus degree from Washington University in St. Louis in 1933 and a Bachelor of Laws from Washington University School of Law in 1933. He was in private practice in Danville, Illinois from 1934 to 1966. He was a Commissioner of the Illinois Court of Claims from 1949 to 1953. He was a member of the Illinois Parole and Pardon Board from 1961 to 1966.

Federal judicial service

Wise was nominated by President Lyndon B. Johnson on August 17, 1966, to a seat on the United States District Court for the Eastern District of Illinois vacated by Judge Casper Platt. He was confirmed by the United States Senate on September 20, 1966, and received his commission on September 21, 1966. He served as Chief Judge from 1972 to 1978, assuming senior status on March 31, 1978. Wise was reassigned by operation of law to the United States District Court for the Central District of Illinois on March 31, 1979, by 92 Stat. 883. His service terminated on March 16, 1982, due to his death in Danville.

References

Sources
 

1909 births
1982 deaths
Illinois state court judges
Judges of the United States District Court for the Eastern District of Illinois
Judges of the United States District Court for the Central District of Illinois
People from Danville, Illinois
People from Mount Carmel, Illinois
United States district court judges appointed by Lyndon B. Johnson
20th-century American judges
Washington University School of Law alumni
20th-century American lawyers
Washington University in St. Louis alumni